Henrik Robert (20 March 1887 – 2 September 1971) was a Norwegian sailor who competed in the 1924 Summer Olympics and in the 1928 Summer Olympics.

In 1924 he won the silver medal in the Olympic monotype event. Four years later he won his second silver medal, this time in the 12 foot dinghy event.

References

External links
 
 

1887 births
1971 deaths
Norwegian male sailors (sport)
Olympic sailors of Norway
Sailors at the 1924 Summer Olympics – Monotype
Sailors at the 1928 Summer Olympics – 12' Dinghy
Olympic silver medalists for Norway
Olympic medalists in sailing
Medalists at the 1928 Summer Olympics
Medalists at the 1924 Summer Olympics